Melamine cyanurate, also known as melamine–cyanuric acid adduct or melamine–cyanuric acid complex, is a crystalline complex formed from a 1:1 mixture of melamine and cyanuric acid. The substance is not a salt despite its non-systematic name melamine cyanurate. The complex is held together by an extensive two-dimensional network of hydrogen bonds between the two compounds, reminiscent of the guanine–cytosine base pairs found in DNA. Melamine cyanurate forms spoke-like crystals from aqueous solutions  and has been implicated as a causative agent for toxicity seen in the Chinese protein export contamination and the 2007 pet food recall.

Chemistry 

The substance is best described as a melamine-cyanuric acid complex, or non-covalent adduct. The two compounds do not form a salt as suggested by its colloquial name melamine cyanurate.

Uses 
Melamine cyanurate is used as a flame retardant, most commonly in polybutylene terephthalate (PBT), polyamide 6 (nylon 6) and polyamide 6,6 (nylon 6:6). It is also used to fireproof in polyester fabrics.

Toxicity 

It has been considered to be more toxic than either melamine or cyanuric acid alone.

 in rats and mice (ingested):

 4.1 g/kg – Melamine cyanurate
 6.0 g/kg – Melamine
 7.7 g/kg – Cyanuric acid

A toxicology study conducted after recent pet food recalls concluded that the combination of melamine and cyanuric acid in diet does lead to acute kidney injury in cats. A 2008 study produced similar experimental results in rats and characterized the melamine and cyanuric acid in contaminated pet food from the 2007 outbreak.

See also 

 1,3,5-Triazine
 Hydrogen bonding

References 

Amines
Triazines
Nephrotoxins
Triketones
Flame retardants